Giulio Gorra (1832 –1884) was an Italian painter.

He was born in Cremona and died in Turin. He trained under Enrico Scuri at the Accademia Carrara in Bergamo. he left the school in 1852 and by 1857 was in Milan. He decorated books and magazines. In 1859, he became a volunteer of Garibaldi and participated in his Invasion of Trentino of 1866.

References

1832 births
1884 deaths
Painters from Cremona
19th-century Italian painters
19th-century Italian male artists
Italian male painters
Painters from Bergamo